Richard Morris, OBE (born 8 October 1947) is an English archaeologist and historian who specialises in the study of churchyard and battlefield archaeology. Having been involved in the discipline since the early 1970s, he has worked at a number of British universities, including the University of Leeds and the University of Huddersfield, as well as publishing a series of books on the subject of archaeology. He has also held a number of significant positions within the British archaeological community. He was  director of the Council for British Archaeology from 1991 to 1999, and was Commissioner of English Heritage.

Morris studied English at Oxford University before proceeding to study music at the University of York, until he finally decided to go into archaeology as an academic vocation. His first book, Cathedrals and Abbeys of England and Wales, was published in 1979, and would be followed by two others on the same subject over the following decade, The Church in British Archaeology (1983) and Churches in the Landscape (1989). Morris then published three books on the role of the Royal Air Force in the Second World War, Guy Gibson (1994), Cheshire: The Biography of Leonard Cheshire VC OM (2000) and Breaching the German Dams (co-authored with Robert Owen, 2008), before returning to the topic of landscape archaeology with Time's Anvil: England, Archaeology and the Imagination (2012) and The Archaeology of English Battlefields: Conflict in the Pre-industrial Landscape (co-authored with Glenn Foard, 2012). Time's Anvil was longlisted for the Samuel Johnson Prize in 2013. He is currently chair of The Blackden Trust, a charitable organisation involved in historical and archaeological investigation of Blackden, the late-medieval home of novelist Alan Garner, in Cheshire.

Biography

Morris initially studied English at Oxford University, before going on to study music at the University of York, and then finally moving into the field of archaeology.

He serves as the chair of The Blackden Trust, a charitable organisation devoted to undertaking historical and archaeological research into the late medieval/early modern building at Blackden in Cheshire, which has been the home of novelist Alan Garner since 1957. In undertaking excavations at the site he has been aided by field archaeologist Mark Roberts of the Institute of Archaeology, University College London.

In 2003, Morris was awarded an Order of the British Empire (OBE) for his services to archaeology. He served as director of the Institute for Medieval Studies at the University of Leeds from 2003 to 2010. In 2007, he was awarded a personal chair from the University of Leeds, as Professor of Research in the Historic Environment. In 2010, he moved to the University of Huddersfield where he was Professor for Conflict and Culture from 2010-2015. Having retired in 2015, he currently serves as Professor Emeritus at Huddersfield.

Bibliography

Books

References

Footnotes

Bibliography

External links
University of Huddersfield staff entry
Debretts entry

English archaeologists
Living people
1947 births